Sodipodi was an open-source vector graphics editor, discontinued in 2004. It is the predecessor to Inkscape.

Development
Sodipodi started as a fork of Gill, a vector-graphics program written by Raph Levien. The main author was Lauris Kaplinski, and several other people contributed to the project. The project is no longer under active development, having been succeeded by Inkscape, a 2003 fork of Sodipodi. Sodipodi means "mish mash" or "hodgepodge" in Estonian child-speak.

The primary design goal of Sodipodi was to produce a usable vector graphics editor, and a drawing tool for artists. Although it used SVG as its native file format (including some extensions to hold metadata), it was not intended to be a full implementation of the SVG standard. Sodipodi imports and exports plain SVG data, and can also export raster graphics in PNG format. The user interface of Sodipodi is a Controlled Single Document Interface (CSDI) similar to GIMP.

Sodipodi was developed for Linux and Microsoft Windows. The last version was 0.34, released on 11 February 2004. Released under the GNU General Public License, Sodipodi is free software.

Derivatives
Sodipodi started a collection of SVG clip art containing symbols and flags from around the world. This work helped inspire the Open Clip Art Library.

Inkscape started as a fork of Sodipodi, founded in 2003 by a group of Sodipodi developers with different goals, including redesigning the interface and closer compliance with the SVG standard.

See also

 Comparison of vector graphics editors

References

External links

 Interview with Lauris Kaplinski
 Working version for Windows 7 and Windows 10

Free vector graphics editors
Vector graphics editors for Linux
Free software programmed in C
Graphics software that uses GTK
Scalable Vector Graphics
Software forks
Estonian brands
Estonian inventions